Fulda imorina is a species of butterfly in the family Hesperiidae. It is found in central and eastern Madagascar. The habitat consists of marshy ground, forest margins and cleared forests.

References

Butterflies described in 1937
Astictopterini